Clemency Margaret Greatrex Burton-Hill  (born 1981) is an English broadcaster, author, novelist, journalist and violinist. In her early career she also worked as an actress. In January 2020 she suffered an AVM brain haemorrhage and underwent emergency surgery in New York City.  She continues to work on her recovery.

Early life and career
Burton-Hill was born in Hammersmith, London, in 1981, the daughter of Humphrey Burton, the BBC's first head of music and arts, and Gillian Hawser, an agent. The couple did not marry and Burton-Hill grew up, near central London, with her mother, alongside two older half-brothers. She got to know her father only in her twenties, although they became close.

She held scholarships at St Paul's Girls' School and Westminster School before reading English at Magdalene College, Cambridge, where she took a Double First. Burton-Hill is also a former scholar at the Royal College of Music, where she was the recipient of the Hugh Bean Violin Prize.

Broadcasting 
Burton-Hill began her broadcasting career in 2008 as a member of the live television presenting team at the Proms for BBC Four and BBC Two. She has continued to present at the Proms since then, interviewing major artists including Philip Glass, Joshua Bell, Marin Alsop, Quincy Jones and Daniel Barenboim. Since 2015, she has presented coverage of the Last Night of The Proms. She was the television host of the BBC's biannual competition BBC Young Musician from 2010 to 2018.

In 2009, Burton-Hill began presenting BBC Radio 3's classical music weekend breakfast programme. In December 2013, she replaced Sara Mohr-Pietsch as the co-presenter of Radio 3's weekday Breakfast programme. She has also presented a wide range of other programmes for the network, including live concerts, a weekly broadcast from Wigmore Hall, and the New Generation Artists strand, which supports emerging international artists early in their career.

She has also written and presented a number of critically acclaimed music documentaries on BBC television including Stradivarius and Me, and Who’s Yehudi, which celebrated the centenary of Yehudi Menuhin, with whom she also took violin lessons as a teenager.

Between 2009 and the show ending in 2015, she was the performing arts reporter for The Culture Show on BBC Two television, presenting more than 30 films about classical music, opera, jazz, theatre and books.

Since 2015, Burton-Hill has been hosting the Royal Opera House’s cinema relays, broadcasting live to over 1,000 cinemas around the globe, and she is a regular host of their 'Insights' education programme, broadcasting to a live audience and on YouTube.

In May 2018, Burton-Hill took on the newly-created role of Creative Director, Music and Arts, at WQXR-FM in New York, the leading classical radio station in the United States.

In July 2018, Burton-Hill began hosting a weekly podcast for BBC Radio 3 called 'Classical Fix' in which she introduces music fans to a variety of classical music and gets their feedback.

Other activities

Journalism and writing 
Burton-Hill's first job in journalism was as a staff writer at Vogue and she has since written for many major UK publications, including The Economist, The FT Weekend, The Guardian, The Observer, The Independent, The Sunday Times, The Sunday Telegraph, The Times Literary Supplement, Elle, and The Mail on Sunday. Her subjects range from the arts to artificial intelligence. She has been the music columnist for BBC Culture since 2013 and is BBC Music Magazine'''s chief interviewer. She was previously the UK's youngest broadsheet columnist, at The Daily Telegraph; a contributing editor for The Spectator; and a columnist at Total Politics and The Liberal magazines.

In January 2009 Burton-Hill's first novel, The Other Side of the Stars, was published by Headline Review, a division of Hodder Headline. She then signed a new two-book deal with Headline, and All The Things You Are was published in October 2013.

In October 2017 her first non-fiction book, Year of Wonder: Classical Music for Every Day was published, by Headline Home, also a division of Hodder Headline. The book has since been sold around the world, and the United States edition was published in November 2018 by Harper Wave, a division of Harper Collins.

In December 2021 her second non-fiction book, Another Year of Wonder: Classical Music for Every Day was published with a foreword by Elizabeth Day. The audio book has been recorded by Eddie Redmayne.

 Live events 
Burton-Hill is a frequent host of live events, panels and debates for organisations such as the Hay Festival and Intelligence Squared, regularly appearing at major arts venues including the Barbican Centre, Cadogan Hall, Wigmore Hall, the National Portrait Gallery, the Victoria and Albert Museum, the Saatchi Gallery, the National Theatre and Old Vic Theatre.

 Music 
Burton-Hill began playing the violin in childhood, studying with Helen Brunner and Rodney Friend. She has performed as a soloist, chamber musician and orchestral violinist, in some of the world's leading concert halls, including La Scala, Milan, the Musikverein, Vienna, London's Barbican Hall and Boston Symphony Hall. She has toured with Daniel Barenboim and the West-Eastern Divan Orchestra, as an honorary violinist.

 Acting 
Between 1992 and 2012 Burton-Hill worked as an actress in film and television productions, appearing in The Higher Mortals (1993), Dream Team (1997–98), The Last of the Blonde Bombshells (2000), Midsomer Murders (2004), Supernova (2005), Hustle (2006), and playing the regular role of Sophie Montgomery in Party Animals (2007), in which her cast-mates included Matt Smith, Andrea Riseborough and Andrew Buchan.

 Other 
On the 2015 Children In Need special edition of the BBC show Only Connect, she appeared alongside David Baddiel and Philip Hensher in the "Music Monkeys" team playing against team "Chess Pieces" made up of Bonnie Greer, Hugh Dennis and A.N. Wilson. She appeared on Pointless Celebrities in December 2013.

Personal life
Burton-Hill married James Roscoe, a British diplomat, in 2008. The couple moved to New York in 2009 where Roscoe was posted to the UK Mission to the United Nations in New York and returned to London in 2013. Following a further period in NY from 2018 to 2022 the family moved to Washington DC in August 2022.  The couple have two sons.

Burton-Hill is a trustee of the children's education charity Dramatic Need.

On 20 January 2020, she collapsed in New York City after suffering a brain haemorrhage and underwent emergency surgery. Doctors removed half of her skull at Mount Sinai West hospital in Manhattan, and she was unconscious for 17 days; it was uncertain how much of her brain would recover. She has recovered with the help of music-based occupational therapy. On 20 January 2021 the first interview with Burton-Hill, who was learning to speak again, was broadcast on BBC Radio 4's Woman's Hour. She interviewed Elizabeth Day for her Classical Fix podcast in August 2021.

Burton-Hill was appointed Member of the Order of the British Empire (MBE) in the 2022 Birthday Honours for services to broadcasting and journalism in the United States of America and the United Kingdom.

Filmography

References

External links

Presenter page at BBC
Interview at "7 days" magazine for The Guardian'' newspaper
Biography at Palestine Mozart Festival

1981 births
Living people
Actresses from London
Alumni of Magdalene College, Cambridge
Alumni of the Royal College of Music
BBC Radio 3 presenters
English classical violinists
British radio presenters
British women radio presenters
Women violinists
English film actresses
English journalists
English television actresses
English voice actresses
People educated at St Paul's Girls' School
People educated at Westminster School, London
Singers from London
Writers from London
21st-century English women singers
21st-century English singers
21st-century classical violinists
Members of the Order of the British Empire